Maggots: The Record is the fourth studio album by American rock singer Wendy O. Williams and her band Plasmatics. It was released on February 18, 1987 by Profile Records. Labeled as a special "9th Anniversary Album", it was the last album released by the band. Despite being labeled a "Plasmatics" album, it is often regarded as another Wendy O. Williams solo album, largely in part because her name is over that of the band, the merchandise for the tour has the WOW logo from her solo career, Michael Ray plays lead guitar here, and the only original member is Wes Beech on rhythm guitar. All music on the record was written and arranged by Michael Ray, except for "Propagators". Maggots: The Record was recorded in 1987 and is a concept album set 25 years in the future, where environmental abuse and the burning of fossil fuels have created a greenhouse effect, leading to an end of the world scenario. The album features various scenes of the White Family over the course of three days. The family is devoured while watching a TV game show. Valerie, the girlfriend of television reporter Bruce is devoured by three massive maggots while lying in her boyfriend's bed. The final scene of the record shows the entire human population is headed for imminent annihilation. The album was released through Profile Records under the WOW label in the United States and overseas by GWR Records, which had been started by Motörhead's longtime manager Doug Smith.

Composition
Maggots: The Record is often credited as being the first "Thrash Metal Opera." This comes largely because of the album follows the rock opera formula done in a form of thrash metal. Every other track on the album is spoken-word and is used to describe various scenes between songs.

The central theme of the album is that a group of scientists trying to eliminate trash in the rivers and oceans develop a breed of maggot designed to eat the garbage and then, when the trash is gone, the maggot dies. Melting glaciers bring floods that carry the maggots into contact with land creatures. The genetically engineered maggots continue to eat and breed, growing larger with every cycle. Scientists and politicians are overheard discussing exactly what can be done, trying to calm the doomed populace. By the album's end, human beings are extinct and the maggots have taken over.

Critical reception 

Upon its release, Maggots: The Record received generally positive review from music critics. A review in Kerrang! gave the album 5 out of 5 Ks, "Quite simply a masterpiece... a work of genius." Wendy's vocals "reduces Celtic Frost's Tom G. Warrior's 'death grunts' to mere whimpers" it went on coupled with "a mixture of hedonistic operatic melodies..gut forged to some of the heaviest armadillo beats you're ever like to hear committed to vinyl."

Track listing

Personnel 

Credits adapted from the album's liner notes.

Plasmatics
 Wendy O. Williams – vocals
 Wes Beech – rhythm guitar, lead guitar, backing vocals
 Michael Ray – rhythm guitar, lead guitar, backing vocals
 Chris Romanelli – bass guitar, backing vocals
 Ray Callahan – drums, backing vocals

Voice actors
 James Gerth – the narrator
 Jeanine P. Morick – Paula White, Dr. Wanda Carnot
 Jeff Griglak – Josh White
 Scott Harlan – Joe White, Dr. Richard Boltzmann, Lance
 Tony Marzocco – Bruce Maltin
 Suzanne Bedford – Valerie, Cindy White
 Andy Bleiberg – anonymous TV anchor #1, TV game show host
 Rod Swenson (credited as Stellar Axeman) – anonymous TV anchor #2

Production
 Rod Swenson – producer
 Wes Beech – associate producer
 Jon Smith – engineer
 Al Theurer – engineer
 Larry Peet – assistant engineer

Packaging
 Rod Swenson (credited as Butch Star) – cover design
 Eric Karalis – cover painting
 John Michaels – photography
 Jack Rudy – Wendy O. Williams' tattoo

References

External links 
 

1987 albums
Concept albums
Plasmatics albums
Profile Records albums
Rock operas
Wendy O. Williams albums
Apocalyptic fiction
Post-apocalyptic fiction
Extinction in fiction